The Roman Catholic Diocese of Meerut is a diocese located in the city of Meerut in the Ecclesiastical province of Agra in India.

History
 20 February 1956: Established as the Diocese of Meerut from the Metropolitan Archdiocese of Agra

Special churches

Minor Basilicas:
Basilica of Our Lady of Graces, Sardhana

Leadership
 Bishops of Meerut (Latin Rite)
 Archbishop Joseph Bartholomew Evangelisti, O.F.M. Cap. (29 February 1956 – 3 August 1973) 
 Bishop Patrick Nair (5 April 1974 – 3 December 2008)
 Bishop Francis Kalist (3 December 2008 – 19 March 2022) Appointed Archbishop of Pondicherry and Cuddalore
 Diocesan Administrator Fr. Valerian Pinto (2nd May, 2022 - Present)

References

External links
 GCatholic.org 
 Catholic Hierarchy 

Roman Catholic dioceses in India
Christian organizations established in 1956
Christianity in Uttar Pradesh
Roman Catholic dioceses and prelatures established in the 20th century
1956 establishments in Uttar Pradesh
Meerut